Gina Rippon (born 1950) is a British neurobiologist and feminist. She is a professor emeritus of cognitive neuroimaging at the Aston Brain Centre, Aston University, Birmingham. Rippon has also sat on the editorial board of the International Journal of Psychophysiology. In 2019, Rippon published her book, Gendered Brain: The New Neuroscience that Shatters the Myth of the Female Brain, which investigates the role of life experiences and biology in brain development.

Career

Researcher 
Rippon gained her PhD in 1982 in physiological psychology and then focused on brain processes and schizophrenia. Rippon's research applies brain imaging techniques, particularly electroencephalography (EEG) and magnetoencephalography (MEG), and uses cognitive neuroscience paradigms to study normal and abnormal cognitive processes. Her work has also focused on Autistic Spectrum Disorders and to developmental dyslexia.

Gendered Brain 
In 2019, Rippon released her book, Gendered Brain: The New Neuroscience that Shatters the Myth of the Female Brain.

Reviews 
Reviews of Rippon's work have been "positive", according to review aggregator Book Marks, with three rave reviews, four positive, and three mixed reviews.

In a review for Nature, neuroscientist Lise Elliot wrote that Rippon's book accomplishes its goal of debunking the concept of a gendered brain. Rhonda Voskuhl and Sabra Klein, of the Organization for the Study of Sex Differences, responded in Nature to Eliot's review, arguing against the idea that sex differences in behavior are due only to culture, and criticizing Eliot's claim that the brain is "no more gendered than the liver or kidneys or heart". They state that biological and cultural effects are not mutually exclusive, and that sex differences occur also in animals, who are not affected by culture. In a review for The Times, psychologist Simon Baron-Cohen stated that "most biologists and neuroscientists agree that prenatal biology and culture combine to explain average sex differences in the brain". He argues that Rippon "[boxes] herself into an extremist position by arguing that it’s all culture and no biology". Writing for The Guardian, Rachel Cooke writes that the book is a "brilliant debunking of the notion of a ‘female brain’". In a mixed review at The New York Journal of Books, Jane Hale noted the book could be improved by finding "a social scientist to partner with".

Views

Criticism of 'neurotrash' 
Rippon is critical of what she sees as the misrepresentation and hijacking of neuroscience, what she calls 'neurotrash'. "The logic of their argument is that males and females are biologically different, men and women are behaviourally different, so their behavioural differences are biologically caused and cannot and, more importantly, should not be challenged or changed. I aim to...  produce a guide to spotting such ‘neurononsense’." Neurotrashers, she says, "extrapolate wildly" from their data and believes that their science can be used for "social engineering" to reinforce perceived male and female roles and status. She says that neurotrashers perpetuate the idea "that biology is destiny. If you are biologically different that's it and if you fight against it in any particular way that's going to be damaging." Rippon cites the work of Louann Brizendine as examples of neurotrash and has also criticized experiments done by Simon Baron-Cohen.

Sex differences in the brain 
Rippon does not believe that there is a "single item type as a male brain or a female brain", instead that "everybody is actually made up of a whole pattern of things, which is maybe due to their biology and maybe due to their different experiences in life." She puts forward the idea that "every brain is different from every other brain".

Rippon is also opposed to the "continued emphasis on 'essentialist', brain-based explanations in both public communication of, and research into, many forms of gender imbalance." When asked for a comparable "watershed" moment in science to compare her findings to, Rippon responded "the idea of the Earth circling around the sun".

Rippon states that "I do think there are sex differences in the brain; there are bound to be, with respect to different roles in the reproductive process". She expanded that, when discussing brain differences, "there are sex differences that we should pay attention to, but the power that’s attributed to biology is what needs challenging".

Media appearances 
Rippon appeared on BBC Radio 4's Today programme alongside professor Robert Winston and BBC's No More Boys And Girls: Can Our Kids Go Gender Free?. She was interviewed on the podcast NOUS on the publication of her book The Gendered Brain, where she responded to her critics.

Bibliography 

Books
 

Journal articles
 
 
 
 
 
 
 
 
 
 
 
 
See also: 
 
 
 

Other articles
 
  Available online here. (See also: neuroscience of sex differences.)
 
See also: 
 A review of: 

Lectures
 
Transcript of a lecture given at the British Science Festival, 18 September 2010.

See also 
 Neuroscience of sex differences
 List of cognitive neuroscientists
 List of developmental psychologists

References

External links 
 Profile page: Professor Gina Rippon, Aston University

1950 births
Academics of Aston University
British cognitive neuroscientists
Developmental psychologists
Living people
British women neuroscientists